Dato' Sri Bernard Chandran (Tamil: பர்னார்ட் சந்திரன்) (born 27 February 1968) is a Malaysian fashion designer. Chandran used to be known as Malaysia's "Prince of Fashion", but is now being hailed as Malaysia's "King of Fashion".

Chandran is also a Malaysian television personality. He has been known as the chief designer of the reality television show Project Runway Malaysia, since its debut on 8TV on 3 August 2007.

Chandran was a guest judge on Britain's Next Top Model, Cycle 6, Episode 12. The top three models were given a chance to model for Chandran's fashion show during the London Fashion Week.

Early years
Bernard Chandran was born to Mr. P. Ramachandran and Mrs. Chow Yook Lin.
Bernard Chandran is of both Indian and Chinese parentage (commonly referred to as Chindian in Malaysia). He grew up in an average Malaysian family. He initially studied fashion in a local fashion college known as International Fashion Training Centre (IFTC) in Petaling Jaya, Selangor, Malaysia.

During his time at the college, he was known for his shyness backstage around the undressed models during his initial fashion shows at the local college. Given three months after graduation to prove himself, he arranged his debut solo show, taking the first steps on the road to becoming Malaysia's top designer. Bernard's father was won over and helped fund his son's further studies, with Bernard soon winning a place at the prestigious Paris Fashion School in Paris, France.

In 1991, he joined the 'Open European Contest for Look of the Year 2000'. Chandran won and broke the record of being the first non-European to win the coveted title. "The contest was gruelling," grinned Bernard. "I am so happy to be the first non-white winner as it proves that Asians are as good as anyone else". For his pains, Chandran received a camera, 19 000 francs, and publicity and contacts, which opened doors.

Fashion business

In the industry 
After working in Paris, he returned to Malaysia to set up his maiden shop in KL Plaza in 1993.  The first 'Bernard Chandran' couture house was a small, rented shop with a handful of staff in the heart of Kuala Lumpur. From there, he built up his client base amongst the who's of Kuala Lumpur, ranging from the rich to royalty.  He has now expanded his shop in KL Plaza to take up 4 shop lots and is nearly 300 square meters in area.  He was voted Designer of the Year by the Malaysian International Fashion Awards in 2003.

Chandran has also started introducing Europe to his couture with a boutique in Knightsbridge, London.

His creations are drawn from Chinese, Malay, Indian and other Eastern cultures.

"My inspiration comes from my customers...how they move, how they talk, their attitudes, their lifestyles. When I first meet a new customer, I make her understand that I am here to make you look good." Chandran's favourite designers are Valentino "...for his femininity and finishing...", and Galliano who "...has a great spirit." He admires Hussein Chalayan for his works and how he dealt with his bankruptcy.

Celebrities in Bernard Chandran 
Estelle notably wore an azure blue dress by the designer with exaggerated pointing hips to perform at the 2008 MTV European Music Awards. She also chose to wear two of his distinctive pieces (one on stage in a duet with Kanye West and one for the red carpet) to the 51st Grammy awards, where she went on to win her first Grammy.

Lady Gaga has also been spotted in designs from Chandran's Collections. She even wore a Chandran piece for her interview with Jay Leno.

English electropop musician Little Boots wore a Chandran dress for her interview with Metro.co.uk.

Rihanna wore a hat from Chandran's Autumn Winter 09 Collection for her famous topless, bondage-style shoot with Vogue Italia.

Tori Amos chose to wear a red gown from Chandran for the cover of her 2009 holiday album, "Midwinter Graces". Chandran had also designed all the 15 gowns for her concert tour that year.

#BlackLivesMatter Controversy 
In 2020, Chandran released a line of designer face masks and promoted it with an Instagram post featuring a black face donning a yellow mask, with Bernard Chandran branding and the hashtag #BlackLivesMatter on the mask. Netizens accused Chandran of blackface and of profiteering off the Black Lives Matter movement.

Family
He is married to one of his former models, Datin Mary Lourdes Chandran (a Malaysian of ethnic Indian origin). She is a former International model and was one of the most successful Malaysian models in the 1980s. Together they have five children.

Dato' Chandran is intensely proud of his Indian ancestry and heritage. His home has many portraits of him, and his family regaled in extravagant historical Indian garbs.

Chandran wants his children to be grounded in Hindu faith.

His younger sister is a former 1990s supermodel, Amy Leela Devi Chandran.

Awards
 He became the first Malaysian to win the 'Open European Contest for Look of the Year 2000' in 1991.
 He was voted Designer of the Year by the Malaysian International Fashion Awards in 2003.
 He received his honorific, Dato', in 2006 when he was awarded the Dato' Indera Mahkota Pahang (DIMP) by the Sultan Ahmad Shah Sultan Abu Bakar, the Sultan of Pahang, Malaysia.
 Chandran was awarded Malaysian International Fashion Alliance's [MIFA] Special Achievement Award 2009.
 He carried honorific title Dato' Sri, in 2016 when he was conferred the Darjah Sri Sultan Ahmad Shah Pahang (SSAP) by the Sultan Ahmad Shah Sultan Abu Bakar, the Sultan of Pahang, Malaysia.

References

External links
 Official Webpage of Bernard Chandran
 Yahoo! group for Bernard Chandran
 Official Facebook Fan Page for Bernard Chandran

Living people
1968 births
People from Petaling District
Malaysian Hindus
Malaysian people of Indian descent
Malaysian people of Chinese descent
Malaysian fashion designers